The 23rd Secretariat of the Communist Party of the Soviet Union was elected by the 23rd Central Committee in the aftermath of the 23rd Congress.

List of members

References

Secretariat of the Central Committee of the Communist Party of the Soviet Union members
1966 establishments in the Soviet Union
1971 disestablishments in the Soviet Union